Austin Corbin (July 11, 1827 – June 4, 1896) was a 19th-century American banking and railroad entrepreneur. He consolidated the rail lines on Long Island, bringing them under the profitable umbrella of the Long Island Rail Road (LIRR). He was the owner of Manhattan Beach, a resort in Brooklyn, New York City, from which he barred Jews. He was also the owner of the Sunnyside Plantation in Chicot County, Arkansas, from 1886 to his death in 1896, where he used convict laborers and later brought Italian immigrants to work on the land.

Early life
Austin Corbin was born on July 11, 1827, in Newport, New Hampshire, to Capt. Austin and Mary (Chase) Corbin, one of three siblings to survive infancy, along with Lois Corbin Dunton, (23 December 1819-7 July 1893), and Daniel Chase Corbin, (1 October 1832-29 June 1918). His brother, Daniel, was also a businessman, involved in banking and railroads, who contributed to the early growth of Spokane, Washington.

Career
Corbin taught school for a short time to earn money for higher education. After graduating from Harvard Law School in 1849, he practiced law in his hometown until 1851, when he moved to Davenport, Iowa. 

In 1854 he became a partner of the Macklot & Corbin banking firm, the only bank in Davenport to not suspend payments in the 1857 financial panic. This success set him up to start the first national bank, when his cousin, Secretary of the Treasury Salmon P. Chase, established the national banking system early in the Civil War. By 1865, when Corbin moved to New York City, he was considered wealthy.

In New York, he founded the Corbin Banking Company, which he leveraged into a successful banking firm, which funded his diversifying into resorts and railroads. In 1873, while following doctors' advice of ocean air for his ill son on Coney Island, Corbin recognized the area as an untapped natural location for a summer resort, and proceeded to purchase  over the next three years, opening a large hotel and a new railway system to deliver New Yorkers to the resort in 1878. Both were an instant success, rewarding Corbin and his associates substantially. He next turned his attention to, in contemporary views, the neglected Long Island area. In 1881, he acquired and consolidated the Long Island Rail Road (LIRR) with the South Side Railroad of Long Island known as the "Montauk" line and Flushing and North Side railroads. Corbin greatly improved the railroad's infrastructure, which had fallen into disrepair after a period of cutthroat competition had thrown all the island's railroads into bankruptcy.

Corbin's most ambitious plan was the  extension of the rail line from Bridgehampton to Montauk, New York, where he planned to open a deepwater port so that trans-Atlantic passengers could shave a day off their voyages by taking the "mile a minute" trains  to New York City. However, the plan never materialized, as the planned port at Fort Pond Bay in Montauk could not be dredged to handle the seagoing vessels.

Corbin's tactic included the infamous strong-arming (along with his cohorts) of the Montaukett tribe out of nearly  they owned around Montauk. The tribe is still seeking compensation for this tactic. Relics from the tribe are still visible at Camp Wikoff which the LIRR sold the government and where Theodore Roosevelt and his Rough Riders were quarantined after returning from the Spanish–American War.

Corbin acquired the Sunnyside Plantation in Chicot County, Arkansas, from John C. Calhoun II, the grandson of John C. Calhoun and brother of Patrick Calhoun, in 1886. In 1894, he entered into an agreement with the state of Arkansas whereby he was given 250 convict laborers to pick cotton for him; the profits were shared between Corbin and the state. Meanwhile, with the help of Emanuele Ruspoli, 1st Prince of Poggio Suasa, who served as the Mayor of Rome from 1892 to 1899, he brought Italian immigrants to work on the plantation. However, Corbin was accused of "peonage."

Corbin was the owner of the resort of Manhattan Beach, Brooklyn. An antisemite, he banned Jews from patronizing the resort. He also developed the Corbin Building in Manhattan between 1888 and 1889.

Personal life
He resided in a mansion in Newport, New Hampshire. He also owned a summer estate in North Babylon, New York along the shores of what is known today as Deer Lake in the Parkdale Estates neighborhood. His daughter married René Chéronnet-Champollion, a French artist and grandson of Jean-François Champollion.

Death and legacy
He died in a carriage accident near his country home in New Hampshire in 1896 at age 68. He is buried in Woodlawn Cemetery in the Bronx.

See also

List of railroad executives

References

External links
Newsday "Our History" Article on Corbin
Coney Island and the Jews (1879), a freely downloadable contemporary book dealing with Corbin's role in banning Jews from his resort
info on Austin Corbin and Corbin Park in his native New Hampshire

1827 births
1896 deaths
People from East Hampton (town), New York
People from Chicot County, Arkansas
Long Island Rail Road people
Manhattan Beach, Brooklyn
Reading Company people
19th-century American railroad executives
Land owners and developers in Rockaway, Queens
Burials at Woodlawn Cemetery (Bronx, New York)
Harvard Law School alumni